Helena Balatková may refer to:

 Helena Šikolová (née Balatková, born 1949), Czechoslovak cross-country skier
 Helena Erbenová (née Balatková, born 1979), Czech cross-country skier and triathlete